Sabunçu is a raion in Baku, Azerbaijan. It has a population of 222,600.

Municipalities
It contains the municipalities of Bakıxanov, Balaxanı, Bilgəh, Kürdəxanı, Maştağa, Nardaran, Pirşağı, Ramanı, Sabunçu, and Zabrat.

References 

Districts of Baku